Santa Catarina Pinula is a town, with a population of 70,982 (2018 census) and a municipality in the Guatemala Department of Guatemala. Its name, according to Guatemalan colonial historian Francisco Antonio de Fuentes y Guzmán in his book Recordación Florida comes from:
 Santa Catarina: the name of it saint patron Catherine of Alexandria
 Pinula: from pipil "Flour of water" ("Pinul": Flour of Pinole and "Ha": Water).  This may come from the Mexican natives who came alongside Alvarado's forces.

History 

The town was originally a native settlement called Pankaj, or Pinola, whose inhabitants presented a strong defense to the conquistadors from Pedro de Alvarado, until they had to finally surrender to the Spanish invaders at the fortified position of Jalpatagua, where they were withdrawn along with the Petapa natives.

Spanish colony

After the Spanish conquest, a town was founded in place of the old native settlement. It soon became one of the most notable settlements in the area, eventually serving as a curato headquarters for the Order of Preachers, which in turn was under the jurisdiction of the Amatitlán convent.

In 1690, when Fuentes y Guzmán wrote Recordación Florida the town was prosperous and its agriculture was booming, but it was not as well to do if its silver mines had been exploited.  Fuentes y Guzmán told the story that, when the church was being built, the workers found a thick silver lining, but they rushed to hide it from the Spaniards, so the latter could not use it.

In 1754, due to a Royal Decree, all the doctrines and curatos still belonging to regular orders were transferred to the secular clergy authorities.

El Cambray II tragedy: 2015

On the night of 1 October 2015 and following several days of heavy rains, a hill collapsed causing a mudslide that destroyed El Cambray II settlement, leaving behind hundreds of missing people, according to the first official reports. Besides, there were nine confirmed deaths, 34 injured and up to 65 displaced on more than 100 destroyed homes. After the landslide, the area was in Code Red.

Administrative organization

The region has a municipal capital (Santa Catarina Pinula), fifteen villages and seven settlements.

Climate

Santa Catarina Pinula has a subtropical highland climate (Köppen: Cwb).

Sport
Guatemalan Olympic swimmer Kevin Avila Soto was born here.

Geographic location

Santa Catarina Pinula is completely surrounded by Guatemala Department municipalities:

See also

 List of places in Guatemala

Notes and references

References

Bibliography

 
 
 
 

Municipalities of the Guatemala Department